Henry Peter (born in 1957), is a French-Swiss lawyer who specialises in corporate law and sports law. He is also a full professor of law at the University of Geneva, where he heads a department dedicated to philanthropy.

Life
Henry Peter completed his studies at the University of Geneva, where he obtained a law degree in 1979. After an internship at the law firm Brunschwig, Biaggi & Lévy in Geneva between 1979 and 1981 and being admitted to the bar in Geneva, he returned to his alma mater and earned a post-graduate diploma in business law in 1983.

Having received a grant from the Swiss National Science Foundation, he began a doctoral thesis and spent a year at the Faculty of Law of University of California, Berkeley carrying out research from 1983 to 1984. In the summer of 1984, he briefly joined the Carter Ledyard & Milburn law firm in New York City. After returning to Switzerland the same year, he became a lawyer in Lugano while simultaneously working on his doctoral thesis, which he defended in 1988 on the subject of "Voidable transfers in groups of companies".

From 1988 to 2006, he was a partner at Sganzini, Bernasconi, Peter & Gaggini in Lugano. He then worked as a senior partner at Peter, Bernasconi & Partners from 2006 to 2009, and then as a senior partner at PSMLaw from 2009 to 2017. In 2017, PSMLaw merged with Kellerhals Carrard and Henry Peter became a partner at their Lugano office.

He specialised in mergers and acquisitions, governance and corporate social responsibility. At the same time, he developed expertise in sports law from 1985, initially by working in the field of Formula One as a lawyer for the Ferrari group. During his career, he has also regularly acted as chair, arbitrator or member of arbitration courts in business or sports law disputes.

He was involved in the legal treatment of the bankruptcy of the Swissair group, a complex case which gave rise to lengthy proceedings throughout the 2000s. He also takes an interest in the social responsibility of companies and international sports federations, and in 2016 he spoke on the subject of the FIFA corruption case and publicly called for a thorough overhaul of the statutes and culture of the football association.

From 2004 to 2015, he was a member of the Swiss Takeover Board, the Swiss federal authority responsible for the supervision of mergers and acquisitions within the Swiss Financial Market Supervisory Authority. In the same field, since 2007 he is also a member of the Swiss Stock Exchange Sanction Commission and has been a member of the editorial board of Swiss Journal of Business and Financial Market Law.

Peter has been very active in associations and committees related to business law, chairing the Geneva Business Law Association from 2003 to 2006 and being appointed  as member of the Debt restructuring procedure group by the Swiss Federal Department of Justice from 2003 to 2008. He also sat on the Board of the Swiss Arbitration Association and was chair of its Swiss Italian section from its creation in 2003 until 2023.

In the field of sports law, he has been vice-chair of the disciplinary chamber for doping cases of the Swiss Olympic Association since 2001, a member of the FIA ethics committee (2014-2022) and sat on the Permanent Arbitral Tribunal of the 31st, 32nd, 33rd and 36th America's Cups.

Henry Peter has also been sitting on the board of directors of several companies, including Swiss Life, Lombard Odier and  Italian luxury fashion house Ermenegildo Zegna. He was also Honorary Consul to Sweden for Italian-speaking Switzerland from 1994 to 2010 and as such has been awarded the Royal Order of the Polar Star in 2005.

In parallel to his activities as a business lawyer, he became a professor at the Faculty of Law of the University of Geneva after receiving his PhD from there in 1988. He taught corporate law and sports law, while progressively holding several important positions within the institution. From 2006 to 2017, he was headed the Business Law Department of the Faculty of Law, and in 2017, he created the Centre for Philanthropy at the same university and became its director. He is also a member of the Committee of the Banking and Financial Law Centre of the University of Geneva, Chairman of the Sports Commission and a member of the Audit Committee of the university.

In the course of his academic career, he has been involved in other institutions, notably the Jean Moulin University Lyon 3 in France, the University of Fribourg, the International Academy of Sport Science and Technology of Lausanne, the Swiss Judicial Academy of Neuchâtel, the Duke Summer Institute, the University of Zurich and the University of Italian Switzerland.

Publications
Henry Peter is the author or co-author of more than a hundred books and publications in his various fields of expertise, including part of the Swiss reference legal commentary Commentaire romand, along with The Routledge Handbook of Taxation and Philanthropy andThe International Handbook of Social Enterprise Law, as well as four successive books dedicated to the decisions made regarding the America's Cup.

References

Academic staff of the University of Geneva
University of Geneva alumni
University of California, Berkeley alumni
20th-century Swiss lawyers
1957 births
Living people
21st-century Swiss lawyers